Farley Green may refer to:
Farley Green, Suffolk
Farley Green, Surrey